Noroshundor (The Barbershop) is a 2009 Bengali political thriller short set in 1971 during Bangladesh Liberation War. It was co-directed by Tareque Masud and Catherine Masud. It deals with nationalism and identity issue daring the war.

Plot
In 1971, during Bangladesh Liberation War, Pakistan Army led a local collaborator raid at the home in searching freedom fighters. The young man they seek flees through the narrow alleyways of Old Dhaka and stumbles upon a barbershop. He quick decides to get a shave to disguise himself. Meanwhile, his mother takes his injured father to a nearby pharmacy. The Hindu doctor hesitantly takes them in because of not getting into target. At the barbershop, the young man soon realizes he has put himself in more danger, where all the barbers are Urdu-speaking Biharis. Who also known to be supporting the Pakistan Army.

Cast
 Anwar Hossain
 Sultana Rebu
 Thomas Baroi
 Members of the Bihari community

References

External links

2009 short films
2009 films
Short films directed by Tareque Masud
Bangladeshi political thriller films
2000s political thriller films
Films directed by Catherine Masud
Films based on the Bangladesh Liberation War